The Rochester City Moose A.F.C. were an American soccer club based out of Rochester, New York. The club participated in the 1919–20 National Challenge Cup, now the Lamar Hunt U.S. Open Cup  and won the Rochester & District Soccer League that same season.

History 

The club was founded in 1896 by Dr. Martin C. Rutherford, who wished to create a soccer club for the Rochester, New York region that was affiliated with the local Moose Lodge community organization.

Honors

Rochester & District League
Winners  1919–20  1

References

Defunct soccer clubs in New York (state)
Men's soccer clubs in New York (state)
1896 establishments in New York (state)
1932 disestablishments in New York (state)
Association football clubs established in 1896
Association football clubs disestablished in 1932